The Drogo Sacramentary (Paris, Bibliothèque Nationale de France, MS lat. 9428) is a Carolingian illuminated manuscript on vellum from  850 AD, one of the monuments of Carolingian book illumination.  It is a sacramentary, a book containing all the prayers spoken by the officiating priest during the course of the year.

The sacramentary was written and painted for the personal use of Charlemagne's son Drogo, the Bishop of Metz. Metz was an important bishopric: Charles the Bald was crowned in the Basilica, and Louis the Pious and his illegitimate half-brother Drogo the Bishop are buried there. In 843 Metz became the capital of the kingdom of Lotharingia, and several diets and councils were held there.

Drogo's position enabled him to be one of the great patrons of 9th-century arts.  He embellished his cathedral in Metz with works which rank among the highlights of Carolingian art in beauty and preciousness. Among them are three surviving manuscripts from the court school, of which the Drogo Sacramentary is the most mature and most accomplished.

This sacramentary is not the product of a monastic scriptorium but reveals an origin in a court school. It contains only those liturgical sections that the bishop spoke. An example of the individual character of its iconography is the initial O for Palm Sunday prayers, which contains a Crucifixion of a new iconographic type, one that would be called christus patiens rather than the triumphant Christ on the cross (christus triumphans) that had been the norm. In the image, the dead and tortured body of Christ spouts water and blood, which are collected by a female figure recognizable as Ecclesia, the Church, in a chalice, that would become entangled with the Holy Grail legend in the future. The Serpent entwines the base of the cross and figures representing the Sun and Moon witness the event from above. The manuscript's style, too, is considered to show the patron's influence, in an unusually unified work of a small group of artists working in close cooperation.

It is 264 mm by 214 mm and has 130 folios.  It is lavishly illuminated. Art historian Sonia Chalif Simon focused on the Drogo Sacramentary for her doctoral dissertation, "Studies on the Drogo Sacrementary: Eschatology and the Priest-King" (1975, Boston University).

References

External links
Facsimile volume, Adeva, Vienna
Adam H. Veil, "Carolingian Crucifixion Iconography"
The christus patiens iconography

9th-century Latin books
9th-century Christian texts
Christian illuminated manuscripts
Carolingian illuminated manuscripts
9th-century Latin writers
Writers from the Carolingian Empire